The gilt-head (sea) bream (Sparus aurata) is a fish of the bream family Sparidae found in the Mediterranean Sea and the eastern coastal regions of the North Atlantic Ocean.

The gilt-head bream is generally considered the best tasting of the breams. It is the single species of the genus Sparus – the Latin name for this fish – which has given the whole family of Sparidae its name. Its specific name, aurata, derives from the gold bar marking between its eyes.

The genome of the species was released in 2018, where the authors detected fast evolution of ovary-biased genes likely resulting from the peculiar reproduction mode of the species.

Names
Known as Orata in antiquity and still today in Italy and Tunisia (known as "Dorada" in Spain and Romania, "Dourada" in Portugal and "Dorade Royale" in France).

Biology

It mainly feeds on shellfish, but also some plant material.

Fisheries and aquaculture

In addition, gilthead seabream have traditionally been cultured extensively in coastal lagoons and saltwater ponds. However, intensive rearing systems were developed during the 1980s, and gilthead seabream has become an important aquaculture species, primarily in the Mediterranean area and Portugal. Reported production was negligible until the late 1980s, but reached  in 2010, thus dwarfing the capture fisheries production. Greece is the biggest seabream producer in Europe, followed by Turkey. 

Gilthead seabreams in aquaculture are susceptible to parasitic infections, including from Enterospora nucleophila.

Cuisine

The fish is widely used in Mediterranean cooking, under a variety of names. In Tunisia, it is known locally as "wrata".  In Spain, it is known as "dorada", and in France, as "dorade".

See also
Acanthopagrus

References

 Alan Davidson, Mediterranean Seafood, Penguin, 1972. , pp. 86–108.

External links
 
 

gilt-head bream
Commercial fish
Fish of Europe
Fish of the Mediterranean Sea
Fish of the North Sea
gilt-head bream
Articles containing video clips
gilt-head bream